Expedition 15 was the 15th expedition to the International Space Station (ISS). Four crew members participated in the expedition, although for most of the expedition's duration only three were on the station at any one time. During Expedition 15, the ISS Integrated Truss Structure was expanded twice: STS-117 brought the S3/S4 truss, and STS-118 brought the S5 truss.

Crew

Crew Notes
Flight Engineer Sunita Williams was the first Expedition 15 crew member to arrive. She participated in Expedition 14, until Expedition 15 Commander Fyodor Yurchikhin assumed command of the station. Williams arrived at the station on 11 December 2006, aboard the Space Shuttle Discovery flight STS-116. Yurchikhin and Flight Engineer Oleg Kotov arrived the station on 9 April 2007 aboard Soyuz TMA-10.

On 26 April 2007, NASA announced that Williams would return to Earth on STS-117, flown by Space Shuttle Atlantis, instead of STS-118 as originally planned. Williams was replaced by Clayton Anderson, who arrived at the station aboard Atlantis, which docked on 10 June 2007.

Expedition 15 ended officially after Expedition 16 Commander Peggy Whitson arrived at the station aboard Soyuz TMA-11, and the official change of command ceremony took place on 19 October 2007.

Backup crew
Roman Romanenko Commander – RSA
Mikhail Korniyenko Flight Engineer – RSA
Gregory Chamitoff Flight Engineer – NASA (for Anderson)

Mission details
Launch: 7 April 2007 17:31 UTC
Docking: 9 April 2007 07:10 UTC
Undocking: 21 October 2007 07:14 UTC
Landing: 21 October 2007 10:46 UTC
LandingSite: Ballistic Trajectory Landing Site northwest of Arkalyk

On 21 October 2007, after the separation of the Soyuz TMA-10 capsule, Moscow Mission Control reported that the Soyuz had entered into a ballistic trajectory, which resulted in a landing that was  short of the intended Kazakhstan landing site. Landing occurred without incident, and by 10:55 UTC, all crew members were out of the capsule, and the vehicle was secured. Until then, the only other time a Soyuz landing had resulted in a ballistic trajectory was the landing of Soyuz TMA-1, for Expedition 6. Another ballistic trajectory occurred with the landing of Soyuz TMA-11 on 19 April 2008 for Expedition 16.

EVAs

EVA 1: 30 May 2007 – Yurchikhin/Kotov, 5 hours, 25 minutes.
EVA 2: 6 June 2007 – Yurchikhin/Kotov, 5 hours, 37 minutes.
EVA 3: 23 July 2007 – Yurchikhin/Anderson 7 hours, 41 minutes.

References

External links

04/04/07: Soyuz Assembly Complete: Expedition 15 to Launch on April 7. Site includes all ISS Status Reports since 2003.
Expedition 15 Photography

Expedition 15
2007 in spaceflight